Swarupnagar Assembly constituency is an assembly constituency in North 24 Parganas district in the Indian state of West Bengal. It is reserved for scheduled castes.

Overview
As per orders of the Delimitation Commission, No. 98 Swarupnagar Assembly constituency (SC) is composed of the following: Swarupnagar community development block, and Ramchandrapur Uday and Sayesta Nagar  I gram panchayats of Baduria community development block.

Swarupnagar Assembly constituency (SC) is part of No. 14 Bangaon (Lok Sabha constituency) (SC). It was earlier part of Basirhat (Lok Sabha constituency).

Members of Legislative Assembly

Election results

2021
In the 2021 elections, Bina Mondol of Trinamool Congress defeated her nearest rival, Brindaban Sarkar of BJP.

2016
In the 2016 elections, Bina Mondol of Trinamool Congress defeated her nearest rival, Dhiman Sarkar of CPI(M).

2011
In the 2011 elections, Bina Mondol of Trinamool Congress defeated her nearest rival Shiva Pada Das of CPI(M).

.# Swing calculated on Congress+Trinamool Congress vote percentages taken together in 2006.

1977-2006
In the 2006, 2001, 1996 and 1991 Mustafa Bin Quassem of CPI(M) won the Swarupnagar assembly seat defeating his nearest rivals - Narayan Goswami of Trinamool Congress in 2006, Swaraj Misra of Trinamool Congress  in 2001, Dipti Jana of Congress in 1996 and Abdul Hai Siddiqui of Congress in 1991. Contests in most years were multi cornered but only winners and runners are being mentioned. Anisur Rahman Biswas of CPI(M) defeated Abdul Hai Siddiqui of Congress in 1987, Harasit Ghosh of Congress in 1982 and Chandranath Misra of Congress in 1977.

1951-1972
Chandranath Misra of Congress won in 1972 and 1971. Jamini Ranjan Sen of CPI won in 1969 and 1967. Abdul Gafur of Congress won in 1962. Mohammad Ishaque of Congress won in 1957 and in independent India's first election in 1951.

References

Assembly constituencies of West Bengal
Politics of North 24 Parganas district